The Georgian National Legion or Georgian Legion (kartuli legioni) is a military unit formed by mostly ethnic Georgian volunteers fighting on the side of Ukraine in the war in Donbas and the Russo-Ukrainian War. The unit was organized in 2014, and in 2016 it was made part of the Ukrainian Army, under the 25th Mechanized Infantry Battalion "Kyiv Rus". 

The unit is commanded by Mamuka Mamulashvili, a veteran Georgian officer. 

The Georgian Legion was noted as being particularly good at recruiting Americans by Kacper Rekawek, an expert on foreign fighters in Ukraine; before the formation of the International Legion of Ukraine in 2022, most pro-Ukrainian foreign fighters served in the Georgian Legion.

History

Background
The Georgian Legion was founded by Mamuka Mamulashvili a veteran of the Abkhaz–Georgian conflict, First Chechen War, and the Russo-Georgian War. He later commented “The idea of creating the legion was to gather people of different nationalities to serve together to stand against Russian aggression, and we did it.” Georgian volunteers frequently cited Ukraine and Georgia's common cause against Russia and insisted that fighting against the Russian aggression in Ukraine was also a patriotic act that served Georgia's interests.

Founding
The Georgian Legion was formed sometime in 2014 after the start of the war in the Donbas with initially only 6 Georgian members and had grown to about 20 members by the end of that year. In mid December 2014 the group was visited by Giorgi Baramidze, the then Georgian minister for European integration. In January 2015, the unit suffered its first casualty, Tamaz Sukhiashvili, a veteran of the Georgian Army. Involvement of individual Georgians on the Ukrainian side was, to a degree, encouraged by the then-Ukraine-based former President of Georgia Mikheil Saakashvili and his associates from Georgia's United National Movement party.

On 5 February, the Georgians' service was appreciated by the head of the Ukrainian Orthodox Church – Kiev Patriarchate, Patriarch Filaret, by awarding 29 Georgian fighters a medal for their "love and sacrifice for Ukraine."

After the Minsk II agreement of February 11, the future of the unit was briefly uncertain. In October the Ukrainian parliament passed a law allowing foreign nationals and stateless persons to be hired by the Ukrainian army on contract and the bill was signed into law on November 5.

Integration with the Ukrainian military 
In February 2016, the Georgian Legion was officially integrated into the 25th mechanized infantry battalion "Kyiv Rus" of the Armed Forces of Ukraine.

It fought in eastern Ukraine under the overall command of the 54th Mechanized Brigade. In December 2017, the Legion withdrew from the brigade citing the "incompetence" of the brigade's command after a costly operation conducted near Svitlodarsk on 16 December 2017. The 54th Mechanized Brigade denied that a "Georgian Legion" had ever existed among their ranks.

In January 2018 the Legion's commander Mamulashvili said the unit remained committed to the Ukrainian cause and moved to another brigade and added that the decision was not connected to a political conflict between Mikheil Saakashvili and President of Ukraine Petro Poroshenko.

In February 2022, immediately prior to the 2022 Russian invasion of Ukraine, the Georgian Legion was involved in training newly recruited Ukrainian civilians. The unit took part in combat from the first days of the invasion; it fought in the Battle of Antonov Airport and Battle of Hostomel. 

In early March 2022, the Georgian Legion reportedly had over 300 new interested recruits attempting to join. According to Legion policy, only experienced fighters or military veterans are allowed to join their ranks. People who didn't meet those requirements were refused.  People with extremist views are also not welcome in the unit. The legion subsequently redeployed to help fend off the Eastern Ukraine offensive.

Casualties 

During the 2022 Russian invasion, 32 Georgian Legion volunteers have so far been reported killed.  These include:

 Gia Beriashvili and Davit Ratiani, who were killed in a nighttime artillery attack during the Battle of Irpin, and later Davit (Dato) Gobejishvili was killed in the same battle.
 Bakhva Chikobava, advisor to Azov Battalion, who was killed during the Siege of Mariupol, and Tato Bigvava (commander of second company Azov), who was killed during the standoff at the Azovstal plant.
 Alexander (Alika) Tsaava, Arkadi Kasradze and Zaza Bitsadze, who were killed in Rubizhne.
 Giorgi Grigolia, who was killed during fighting near Bakhmut.
 Kiril Shanava and Kakha Gogol, who were killed during fighting in Luhansk Kakha Gogol was reportedly killed as a result of an airstrike.
 Aluda Zviadauri, who was killed during fighting near Lysychansk.
 Davit Menabdishvili and Nikoloz (Nika) Shanava, who were killed fighting in Izyum
 Rati Shurgaia, who died as a result of injuries sustained during fighting near Izyum

Accusation of war crime 

On 30 March 2022, a video surfaced of the aftermath of an ambushed Russian paratrooper BMD-2 armored vehicle, geolocated in the area of Dmitrovka located a few kilometers from Bucha, Kyiv Oblast.  A different video of the same event shows how one of the captured and seemingly injured Russian serviceman is shot by an unknown member of the Ukrainian forces.

Ukrainian Foreign Minister Dmytro Kuleba said the video will "definitely be investigated". Mamuka Mamulashvili denied the Georgian in the video was part of the Legion.

Foreign fighters 
The Georgian Legion is made up of about 500 Georgians and an equal number of various other nationalities. 

The following countries have had nationals reported as being members of the Georgian Legion:

Albania
Armenia
Australia
Austria
Azerbaijan
Canada 
Chile
Croatia
France
Georgia
Germany
Greece
India 
Israel
Japan
Mexico
Moldova
Serbia
Taiwan
United States
United Kingdom

Activities
The Legion conducts sabotage, ambush and reconnaissance activities behind enemy lines and participated in a number of major battles. They also instruct and train Ukrainian civilians, police officers, soldiers and foreign volunteers.

See also 
International Legion of Territorial Defense of Ukraine: A similar unit composed of foreign volunteers fighting for Ukraine established in 2022.

References

External links 
 
 
 
  Official website

Regiments of the International Legion of Territorial Defense of Ukraine
Foreign volunteer units resisting the 2022 Russian invasion of Ukraine
Military units and formations of Ukraine in the war in Donbas
2014 establishments in Ukraine
Military units and formations established in 2014
Georgia (country)–Ukraine relations